Aaron Anthony Connolly (born 28 January 2000) is an Irish professional footballer who plays as a forward for  club Hull City, on loan from  club Brighton & Hove Albion, and for the Republic of Ireland national team.

Club career

Brighton & Hove Albion
Connolly was born in Oranmore, Galway and started his career in the youth team of Maree/Oranmore FC in 2005. He joined Mervue United's youth team at the age of 11. In the summer of 2016 he joined Premier League side Brighton & Hove Albion on trial, impressing enough for the club to offer him a two-year scholarship with the under-18 side. He was fast-tracked in the under-23 side and also went on to make his debut for the first team at the age of 17 when he appeared as a substitute for Tomer Hemed in the 1–0 EFL Cup win over Barnet in August 2017. He signed a new three-and-a-half-year contract with Brighton on 31 January 2019.

Loan to Luton Town
On 31 January 2019, Connolly joined League One leaders Luton Town on loan for the remainder of the 2018–19 season. He officially joined up with Luton on 2 April 2019 after returning from injury. Connolly made his football league and Luton debut on 13 April coming on in the 68th minute at 1–1 away to Charlton. Luton went on to lose 3–1 at The Valley.

Return to Brighton
On 27 August 2019, Connolly scored his first senior goal in a 2–1 away win over Bristol Rovers in the EFL Cup. He made his league debut for Brighton four days later, coming on as a substitute for Neal Maupay in the 66th minute of a 4–0 defeat away to Manchester City. Connolly made another appearance from the bench in The Seagulls next fixture, a 1–1 home draw against Burnley on 14 September. He made his first Premier League start on 5 October in a match against Tottenham Hotspur where he scored his first two Premier League goals in the 3–0 home victory. Connolly's next goal came in the last game of the season in a 2–1 away win over Burnley, finishing the season with three goals in 24 league appearances.
He signed a new four-year contract with Brighton in July 2020.

Connolly scored his first goal of the 2020–21 season in Brighton's second league match scoring The Albions third in a 3–0 away win at Newcastle. He scored his second goal of the season on the second day of the new year tapping The Seagulls into the lead in an eventual 3–3 draw in which he came off injured at the break against Wolves. Connolly came on as a substitute in Brighton's 1–0 away victory over defending champions Liverpool on 3 February claiming their first league win at Anfield since 1982.

Connolly scored his first goal of the 2021–22 season scoring a brace and the only goals in the 2–0 EFL Cup third round home victory over Swansea City on 22 September.
He made his first Premier League start of the campaign on 15 December, where his fourth overall league appearance of the season only lasted 61 minutes, being replaced by Alexis Mac Allister in the 1–0 home defeat against Wolves.

Loan to Middlesbrough
On 2 January 2022, Connolly joined Championship club Middlesbrough on loan until the end of the season. He made his Boro and Championship debut on 15 January, playing 67 minutes before being replaced by fellow loanee Folarin Balogun in the eventual 2–1 home victory over Reading. Connolly featured as a substitute in the eventual penalty shootout victory over Manchester United in the FA Cup fourth round at Old Trafford on 4 February. Eight days later he scored his first goal for Boro, in the 4–1 home victory over Derby County, putting Middlesbrough into a play-off spot. It took Connolly eight further games to score his second goal for the side, opening the scoreline in the 2–0 away win over Birmingham City on 15 March.

Loan to Venezia
On 14 July 2022, Connolly joined Italian Serie B club Venezia on a loan deal for the 2022–23 season.

Loan to Hull City
On 6 January 2023, Connolly returned early from Venezia and joined Hull City on a loan deal until the end of the season. He made his debut a day later, coming on as 61st minute substitute replacing Harvey Vale, in the 2–0 FA Cup third round home loss to Premier League opposition Fulham. On 28 January, Connolly's 23rd birthday, he scored his first Hull goals, netting two in the 3–0 home win over Queens Park Rangers.

International career
Connolly has represented the Republic of Ireland at under-17, under-19 and under-21 level. He was leading goalscorer in the qualifying stage for the 2017 UEFA European Under-17 Championship, scoring seven goals in six matches. He featured in all four matches in the final tournament held in Croatia, but failed to score as Ireland were eliminated by England in the quarter-finals. 

Connolly was included in the Republic of Ireland U21 squad for the 2019 Toulon Tournament. Connolly started Ireland's opening group match vs China U23 and marked it with a goal and an assist for Zak Elbouzedi in a 4–1 win.

On 5 October 2019, he received his first call-up for the Republic of Ireland senior team for the Euro 2020 qualifying matches against Georgia and Switzerland. He made his debut against Georgia on 12 October 2019, replacing James Collins when he came on as a substitute in the 79th minute in the 0–0 away draw.

After over a year without a cap at senior level, Connolly made a return to the Republic of Ireland U21 side in November 2022, when he was called up for their double header of games against Israel U21 in the 2023 UEFA European Under-21 Championship Qualification Play-offs.

Career statistics

Club

International

References

External links

2000 births
Living people
Republic of Ireland association footballers
Republic of Ireland youth international footballers
Republic of Ireland international footballers
Sportspeople from Galway (city)
Association football forwards
Mervue United A.F.C. players
Brighton & Hove Albion F.C. players
Luton Town F.C. players
Middlesbrough F.C. players
Venezia F.C. players
Hull City A.F.C. players
English Football League players
Premier League players
Serie B players
Irish expatriate association footballers
Expatriate footballers in England
Irish expatriate sportspeople in England
Expatriate footballers in Italy
Irish expatriate sportspeople in Italy